Emery is both a given name and an English and French surname. It is a variant form of the name Amalric.

Emery may refer to:

Given name
 Emery Barnes (1929–1998), football player and Canadian politician
 Emery G. Barrette (1930-1993), American politician and Methodist minister
 Emery Emery (born 1963), American comedian, film editor and producer, and outspoken atheist
 Emery Lehman (born 1996), American Olympic speed skater
 Emery Moorehead (born 1954), tight end/wide receiver in the National Football League
 Emery Walker (1851–1933), English engraver, photographer and printer
 Emery Welshman (born 1991), Guyanese footballer

Middle name
 George Washington Emery Dorsey (1842–1911), U.S. Congressional Representative from Nebraska
 Gilbert Emery Bensley Pottle (1875–1945), American actor better known by his stage name, Gilbert Emery
 Roy Emery Dunn (1886–1985), American businessman and politician

Surname
 Alan R. Emery (born 1939), Canadian marine biologist
 Alison Emery (born 1989), British ice hockey player
 Benoit Pierre Emery (born 1970), French fashion designer
 Carlo Emery (1848–1925), Italian entomologist
 Chris Hamilton-Emery (born 1963), British poet and literary publisher
 Christopher Emery (born 1957), American government official and author
 Colin Emery (born 1946), Scottish footballer
 Dave Emery (born 1948), American politician 
 Dennis Emery (1933–1986), English footballer
 Dick Emery (1915–1983), British comedian and actor
 Don Emery (1920–1993), Welsh footballer
 Emery Emery (born 1963), American comedian and film producer
 Fred Emery (footballer) (1900–1959), English footballer
 Freddie Emery-Wallis (1927–2017), British politician 
 Frederick Edmund Emery (1925–1997), Australian scientist
 Gareth Emery (born 1980), British music producer and DJ
 George W. Emery (1830–1909), American politician
 Georgia Emery (1867–1931), American businesswoman
 Gideon Emery (born 1972), English singer and film and voice actor
 Irene Emery (1900–1981), American art historian, scholar, curator, textile anthropologist, sculptor, and modern dancer
 Jackson Emery (born 1987), American basketball player
 John Emery (disambiguation), multiple people
 Kenneth O. Emery (1914–1998), Canadian-American marine geologist
 Marc Emery (born 1958), Canadian activist and entrepreneur
 Maunga Emery (1933–2011), New Zealand rugby player
 Nicholas Emery (1776–1861), American politician and judge
 Paul Emery (1916–1993), English racing driver
 Peter Emery (1926–2004), British politician 
 Phil Emery (born 1964), Australian cricketer
 Phil Emery (American football) (born 1959), American football scout and coach
 Ray Emery (1982–2018), Canadian ice-hockey goaltender
 Ray Emery (cricketer) (1915–1982), New Zealand cricketer and pilot
 Robert W. Emery, American gymnast
 Roe Emery (1874–1953), American businessman
 Sid Emery (1885–1967), Australian cricketer 
 Unai Emery (born 1971), Spanish football coach
 Victor Emery (1934–2002), British physicist
 Walter Bryan Emery (1903–1971), British Egyptologist
 William Emery (priest) (1825–1910), British archdeacon
 William Emery (MP) (died 1432), Member of Parliament for Canterbury

See also
 Amory (name)
 Emory (name)
 Emery (disambiguation)
 R. Lee Ermey (1944–2018), actor

English given names
English-language surnames
French-language surnames
English-language unisex given names